Petroff Point (‘Petrov Nos’ \pe-'trov 'nos\) is a rocky point on the east coast of Brabant Island in the Palmer Archipelago, Antarctica projecting northeastwards 1.2 km into Hill Bay.  Situated 3.85 km northwest of Mitchell Point and 6.8 km southwest of Spallanzani Point.

The point is named for the "Bulgarian-American inventor Peter Petroff (1919–2003) who developed the first digital watch."

Location
British mapping in 1980.

Maps
 Antarctic Digital Database (ADD). Scale 1:250000 topographic map of Antarctica. Scientific Committee on Antarctic Research (SCAR). Since 1993, regularly upgraded and updated.
British Antarctic Territory. Scale 1:200000 topographic map. DOS 610 Series, Sheet W 64 62. Directorate of Overseas Surveys, Tolworth, UK, 1980.
Brabant Island to Argentine Islands. Scale 1:250000 topographic map. British Antarctic Survey, 2008.

Notes

References
 Bulgarian Antarctic Gazetteer. Antarctic Place-names Commission. (details in Bulgarian, basic data in English)

External links
 Petroff Point. Copernix satellite image

Headlands of the Palmer Archipelago
Bulgaria and the Antarctic